Michael Tait Moran (born 29 January 2001) is an English footballer who plays for  side Stafford Rangers, on loan from  side Tamworth. He plays as a forward.

Club career

Aston Villa
Tait started training with Aston Villa at the age of seven and progressed through their academy sides, he signed his first professional contract in September 2019 aged 17, a two-year deal following a strong start to the season where he scored seven goals at youth level.

On 3 September 2019, Tait made his professional debut for Aston Villa in the 2019-20 EFL Trophy, starting in a 2-0 away defeat at Salford City. Tait was named on the bench on 8 January 2021 in an FA Cup third round tie against Liverpool, but did not feature in the match. He was released from Aston Villa in 2021.

Tamworth
On 7 September 2021, Tait was announced as a signing for Southern League Premier Division Central side Tamworth. On the same night Tait made his debut in a Southern League Cup fixture at home to Coalville Town, playing the full match in a 3-1 defeat.

Tait made a late cameo in the FA Cup 2nd qualifying round 5-0 away demolition of Belper Town on 18 September 2021, with the attacking player coming on as a 76th minute substitute for defender Lucas Yeomans, and even scored his first goal for the club on the 81st minute to complete the rout. He also made a substitute appearance in the next round on 2 October 2021, as Tamworth defeated Leiston 3-1 away from home, Michael came on as a 65th minute substitute for Dexter Walters in the match.

His long awaited Southern League Premier Division Central debut came on 23 October 2021, starting in a home fixture against Leiston. Tamworth found themselves 2-0 down at half time, and Tait was substituted at the beginning of the second half for the returning Shaquille McDonald, who went on to score Tamworth's only goal in the game in a disappointing 3-1 home defeat.

Stafford Rangers (loan)
On 18 November 2021, Tait signed for Northern Premier League Premier Division side Stafford Rangers on a loan deal until 17th January 2022.

Career statistics

References

External links
 
 

Living people
English footballers
2001 births
Association football forwards
Aston Villa F.C. players
Tamworth F.C. players
Stafford Rangers F.C. players